is a fictional character in the manga series Death Note, created by Tsugumi Ohba and Takeshi Obata. Takada is introduced in the series as a classmate of Light Yagami, with whom she briefly dates in college. She later reappears in the post-timeskip story, in which Takada is recruited by Teru Mikami to become Kira's spokesperson to the world, a task she takes on with honor and pleasure after discovering Kira's true identity as her ex-boyfriend Light.

In the anime adaptation of the manga, Takada is initially voiced by Masumi Okamura and later by Maaya Sakamoto in Japanese, while Heather Doerksen dubs her in the English version. In the live-action film Death Note 2: The Last Name, she is portrayed by Nana Katase.

Creation and conception
Kiyomi Takada was created as a character that would go well with Light Yagami, which is why she was given her school idol identity. Tsugumi Ohba felt that because of her "normal name" her unplanned death added unpredictability to the series. Takada was originally going to be reintroduced at the same time as Mello and Near, but Ohba forgot about her until he prepared for a Weekly Shōnen Jump interview. He felt that he may have reintroduced Takada because he could not forget the "Refined Takada." Takeshi Obata felt that he did not put much thought into Takada's university student design because he has difficulty designing female characters. He found the process of aging Takada difficult because he could not get the design to "look like her." In contrast to Misa Amane's wardrobe, he gave Takada formal clothing to go with her job as a newscaster. Her birthday is July 12, 1985. It is told in How to Read It that, in the anime, her voice was abnormally hoarse originally, and blossomed into a more mature, feminine voice. This was to give the impression that she has matured alongside Light, and was a good partner for him. This made her eventual murder at the hands of Light's Death Note even more surprising.

Appearances

In Death Note

Kiyomi Takada first appears for a short period as Light Yagami's classmate and girlfriend; Light appeared with Takada in public to disguise the fact that he also conversed with Misa Amane. Takada is a popular girl also known as "Miss To-Oh", short for To-Oh University, or "Refined Takada". She returns five years later in the story as an announcer of NHN chosen by Teru Mikami to be Kira's spokesperson to the world. Light realizes that he can use this connection with Takada to his advantage and sets up a meeting with her, presumably for the benefit of the investigation. While the two meet, Takada receives a call from Mikami and Light reveals himself to Mikami as Kira. They create a ploy to force the Kira Investigation Team to remove all bugs from the room, after which Light tells Takada that he wants her to be his goddess in the new world. Light then tells the investigation team that he will be pretending to be Takada's boyfriend to catch Kira.

Following Light's instructions, Takada asks Mikami to send her five pages of the Death Note. She tells him that he will continue his work in a fake book made to look like the real one. While walking to a broadcast, Misa runs into Takada and rushes her, jealous that she is not the most popular star. Halle Lidner, who has been sent by Near to act as Takada's bodyguard, stops her then, but Takada meets with Misa for a girl-to-girl talk soon after. Lidner sits in with them. By the end of the conversation, Takada is convinced that Misa is stupid and Lidner reports to Near about the love triangle between Light, Takada and Misa.

Later, Takada tells of her meeting with Misa to Light, who assures her that she is the only one for him. He then writes a script for Takada that makes it sound like she has agreed to help capture Kira. She is subsequently kidnapped and forced to strip naked by Mello in an effort to set up a meeting between the SPK and the Kira Investigation Team. Prepared to face such an event, however, Takada kills Mello by writing his name in a piece of the Death Note she managed to secret away in her bra. Once Light hears about this, he uses a piece of the Death Note of his own to make her commit suicide. Takada's death was not mourned but instead considered an embarrassment to Kira's supporters that she would allow herself to be killed so easily and many spokespeople immediately started campaigns to become her successor, much to the Kira Investigation Team's disgust.

Takada's death would ultimately result in Light's downfall. Unbeknownst to Light as he wrote Takada's name in his torn off piece of the Death Note, Mikami had visited his safe deposit box and wrote down Takada's name in the real Death Note just one minute later, unaware Light had the same intention. This allowed Near's right-hand man Stephen Gevanni, who'd been following Mikami, to discover the real notebook and Mikami's deception. This ultimately allowed Near to expose Light and Mikami as Kira and X-Kira, leading to their deaths and ending Light's reign as Kira (which is hinted to have been Mello's true reason for kidnapping Takada and knew it would likely cost him his life).

In other media
In Death Note 2: The Last Name, she is played by Nana Katase, filling in the film the role Kyosuke Higuchi plays in the manga. When Rem gives her the Death Note, Takada kills a rival anchorwoman to become the lead anchor, although she does continue to kill criminals as instructed by Light via Rem. When she is arrested, Light kills her in order to regain ownership of the Note, although his action goes unnoticed by the other investigators. Shusuke Kaneko, director of the film, said that the film Takada bears importance in "reminding us the satanic power of the Death Note." Nana Katase, who read all of the Death Note volumes, describes her scenes, including those portrayed on video monitors, as "terrifying." Katase says that she and the film Takada have "a strong sense of justice", but that Katase personally would not kill anyone based on those ideals.

In the Japanese special Death Note: Relight 2 - L's Successors, Light's meeting with Takada and Mikami is moved to earlier than it occurred in the anime and manga, as the mafia plot is omitted. As such, it is instead Takada and Mikami who kill the SPK.

Reception
Hannah Grimes of Comic Book Resources wrote, "Kiyomi Takada isn't exactly the most well-liked character in terms of personality, as she really isn't much aside from someone who's completely devoted to and gets used by Kira. However, that can't be said about her near-impeccable fashion sense. As a television personality, she always has to make sure she looks sharp and ready for the cameras." Sonal, another Comic Book Resources writer, said, "The issue with her character is that she is introduced as someone smart without letting the audience decide for themselves as to how intelligent she is. To make things worse, she gets no screen time and thus, no development. To add insult to injury, she is made out to be a Kira groupie, thus giving her absolutely no characteristic outside of that."

See also

References 

Comics characters introduced in 2004
Death Note characters
Female characters in anime and manga
Fictional television personalities
Fictional Japanese people in anime and manga
Fictional murdered people
Vigilante characters in comics